Erith Island, the second largest island in the Kent Group, is a densely vegetated and unpopulated  granite island with steep slopes, located in the Bass Strait, lying off the north-east coast of Tasmania, between the Furneaux Group and Wilsons Promontory in Victoria, Australia.

The island is contained within the Kent Group National Park, Tasmania's northernmost national park, which was gazetted in 2002.  Erith was highly modified for cattle grazing and is mainly covered by exotic pasture.  Grazing ended with the acquisition of the lease in 1997 by the Australian Bush Heritage Fund, which subsequently relinquished it to the Tasmanian Government for incorporation in the national park.

Fauna
Recorded breeding seabird and wader species include little penguin, short-tailed shearwater, Pacific gull, and sooty oystercatcher.  Mammals on Erith are the southern brown bandicoot, long-nosed potoroo and common brushtail possum.  Reptiles include the metallic skink, eastern three-lined skink, White's skink and white-lipped snake.

See also

 List of islands of Tasmania
 Protected areas of Tasmania

References

External links
 

Islands of North East Tasmania
Protected areas of Tasmania
Islands of Bass Strait